The Students' Islamic Movement of India (abbreviated SIMI) is a banned terrorist organisation that was formed in Aligarh, Uttar Pradesh in April 1977. The stated mission of SIMI is the ‘liberation of India’ by converting it to an Islamic land. The SIMI, an organisation of extremists has declared Jihad against India, the aim of which is to establish Dar-ul-Islam (land of Islam) by either forcefully converting everyone to Islam or by violence. The Indian government describes it as a terrorist organisation, and banned it in 2001, shortly after the 9/11 attacks. The ban was lifted in August 2008 by a special tribunal, but was reinstated by K.G. Balakrishnan, then Chief Justice, on 6 August 2008 on national security grounds.

In February 2019, the Government of India extended ban on SIMI for a period of five more years starting 1 February 2019 under Unlawful Activities (Prevention) Act.

Background
On 25 April 1977, SIMI was founded in Aligarh, in the state of Uttar Pradesh, with Mohammad Ahmadullah Siddiqi as its founding president. (Siddiqi currently serves as a Professor of English and Journalism at Western Illinois University in Macomb, IL.). In 1981, SIMI activists protested against PLO leader Yasser Arafat's visit to India, and greeted him with black flags in New Delhi. Young SIMI activists viewed Arafat as a Western puppet, while the senior Jamaat-e-Islami Hind (JIH) leaders saw Arafat as a champion of the Palestinian cause. The JIH also became uncomfortable with SIMI's support of the 1979 Iranian Revolution and its communal orientation. After distancing itself from SIMI, JIH reverted to relying on the older student organization, SIO.

Ideology

The Students Islamic Movement of India (SIMI), proscribed under the Unlawful Activities (Prevention) Act 1967, is an Islamist fundamentalist organization, which advocates the ‘liberation of India’ by converting it to an Islamic land. The SIMI, an organisation of young extremist students has declared Jihad against India, the aim of which is to establish Dar-ul-Islam (land of Islam) by either forcefully converting everyone to Islam or by violence.
SIMI maintains that concepts of secularism, democracy and nationalism, keystones of Indian Constitution, are antithetical to Islam. Among its various objectives, SIMI aims to counter what it perceives as the increasing moral degeneration, sexual anarchy in Indian society and the 'in sensitiveness' of a 'decadent' West. They aim to restore the supremacy of Islam through the resurrection of the khilafat, emphasis on the Muslim ummah and the waging of jihad.

According to Sayeed Khan, a former president of SIMI, the group became more militant and extremist in the backdrop of communal riots and violence between Hindu and Muslim groups in the 1980s and 1990s.

Clashes with Hindu Organisations

SIMI organised violent protests against the demolition of the Babri Mosque. In the nationwide violence that followed the demolitions, SIMI activists clashed against the Police and the VHP.

Ban and aftermath
The Government of India, by notification dated 8 February 2006 banned SIMI for the third time. SIMI was first banned on 26 September 2001 immediately following the September 11 attacks in the United States. SIMI remained banned from 27 September 2001 to 27 September 2003 during which period several prosecutions were launched against its members under the provisions of Terrorist and Disruptive Activities (Prevention) Act, the Maharashtra Control of Organised Crime Act (MCOCA), and the Unlawful Activities (Prevention) Act 1967.

SIMI was banned for the third time on 8 February 2006. The second ban of SIMI dated 27 September 2003 came to an end on 27 September 2005. Therefore, SIMI was in existence between 28 September 2005 and 7 February 2006 but was believed to be dysfunctional due to the fact that many of its members were demoralised or had crossed the age of 30 years; which automatically made them ineligible to continue as a member of SIMI - SIMI has an age limit of 30 years for membership. Many of its members had to fight cases registered against them by the Government.

However, on 27 July 2006, a spokesperson of the Indian Government told the Unlawful Activities (Prevention) Tribunal held in New Delhi, that contrary to notions that SIMI's activities declined following its ban, the organisation "had stepped up its subversive activities and was involved in almost all major explosions, communal violence and circulation of inflammatory material across the country."

The ban notification and the background note stated that SIMI deserved to be banned for clandestine activities and links with around 20 organisations through whom SIMI was allegedly operating. The background note clearly says that there was no violent incident in which SIMI was involved in the last 2–3 years.

To prove its case against SIMI, the Government cited several cases under the Unlawful Activities (Prevention) Act registered between 1998 and 2001.

The third ban on SIMI was lifted by the Delhi High Court Tribunal on 5 August 2008. "Material given by the home ministry is insufficient, so ban cannot be continued," Justice Geeta Mittal, a sitting Delhi High Court judge, said while lifting the ban. But the lifting of the ban was stayed by the supreme court of India on the next day itself(6 August 2008).

A special tribunal has upheld the ban imposed on SIMI by the Home Ministry under the Unlawful Activities (Prevention) Act, 1967. The Tribunal's head confirming the ban held that SIMI has links with Pakistan-based terror outfits and its front, the Indian Mujahideen.

Transformation into Indian Mujahideen
The exact nature of the relationship between SIMI and Indian Mujahideen (IM) is debated. Some analysts contend that IM is a militant branch of SIMI while others believe that the two groups are distinct although linked.

Front outfits
SIMI operate under various fronts to avoid law enforcement agencies after it was banned in 2001. Some of these outfits include:
 Khair-e-Ummat Trust,
 Popular Front of India,
 Tahreek-e-Ahyaa-e-Ummat (TEU),
 Tehreek-Talaba-e-Arabia (TTA),
 Tahrik Tahaffuz-e-Sha´air-e-Islam (TTSI)
 Wahdat-e-Islami

Kerala 

SIMI conducted  training camps in the southern Indian state of Kerala.

Binanipuram camp 

A camp was organised in 2006 at Binanipuram near Aluva in Ernakulam district of Kerala state. 40-50 SIMI members were trained in commando and jungle warfare skills.

On 15 August 2006, Kerala police questioned 18 people and arrested five — Ansar Moulavi, Shaduli, Nizamuddin, Abdul Rafeeq and Shamas — under the Unlawful Activities (Prevention) Act. The five arrested were later released on bail.

Ansar Moulavi and Shaduli are also accused of attending another training camp at Vagamon conducted between December 2007 - January 2008. Both were arrested after the 13 May 2008 Jaipur bombings by the Rajasthan police.

Vagamon camp 

A camp was conducted at Thangalpara, Vagamon in Idukki district of Kerala in December 2007-January 2008. Camp attendees are said to be trained in commando, jungle warfare, trekking, rock climbing, rappeling and herbal medicine. Speeches inciting the participants to wage jihad (war) against India are said to be made.

About 20 students from Hubli, Belgaum and Bangalore were trained to assemble explosives with easily available materials by a bomb expert Abdul Subhan Qureshi. Ammonium nitrate, a commonly available nitrogenous fertiliser, was used in the 2008 Ahmedabad bombings. Prototypes of liquid bombs using commonly available hydrogen peroxide were first experimented at the Vagamon camp.

Abdul Sathar alias Manzoor, from Aluva in Kerala, is accused of attending the camp and of being involved in the 2008 Ahmedabad bombings and 2008 Bangalore serial blasts. He is also accused of recruitment of youths from Kerala and sending them to Pakistan for terror training by the Lashkar-e-Taiba. Declared a proclaimed offender, an Interpol red alert notice was issued against him. A fugitive for six years, he was deported from Dubai on 2 August 2013 and arrested on arrival in India.

Kannur camp

On 23 April 2013, a terror training camp inside a building owned by Thanal Foundation Trust in Mayyil Narath area of Kannur district was organised by members of Popular Front of India (PFI), a SIMI front. The camp was raided by police and 21 people were arrested. Country bombs, a sword, a human effigy, cellphones and accessories for making bombs were recovered during the police raid.

According to the charge sheet filed by the investigators, activists belonging to Popular Front of India and its political wing Social Democratic Party of India had organised this training camp. The charge sheet said that one of the participants had links with Indian Mujahideen terrorist group. The investigators provided evidence of transfer of funds between bank accounts to prove its allegations. The bank accounts details of Sanaulla Shabandri were found during the raid on the house of one of the accused. Shabandri from Bhatkal, is believed to be a close associate of Yasin Bhatkal and an Indian Mujahideen member.

On 21 January 2016, a court sentenced 21 of those accused to varying years of imprisonments after they were found guilty under several charges including criminal conspiracy, membership of unlawful assembly, possession of arms and explosive substances, inciting communal disharmony, assertions prejudicial to national integration besides organising a terrorist camp.

The court found that the enterprise was unlawful and that the accused persons could not explain why they were in possession of weapons and country-bombs.

Karnataka

Castle Rock camp 

In April 2007, SIMI held a terrorist training camp at Castle Rock near Hubli, under the cover of hosting an outdoors event.

Gujarat

Pavagadh camp 

In January 2008, a training camp at an isolated place near the Khundpir (also spelt Khundmeer) dargah near Pavagadh in Gujarat state was reportedly used to train SIMI activists for the 2008 bomb attacks on the cities of Ahmedabad and Surat.

Incidents

2006
30 October: Noor-ul-Hooda, a SIMI activist, was arrested by the police for his alleged involvement in the 2006 Malegaon blasts. Authorities said the bombs used in the blasts were assembled in the garage of "main conspirator" Shabbir at Malegaon. Maharashtra police claims that 2006 Malegaon blasts were the handiwork of ex-SIMI members. But later on Law enforcement agencies decided not to oppose bail plea of Muslim youths because the role of a Hindu Radical organisation became evident when investigation progressed further

2007
15 February: The Supreme Court describes the banned Students Islamic Movement of India as a "secessionist movement."

2008
27 March: SIMI Ex-general secretary Safdar Nagori (Mahidpur), Amil Parvez(Unhel) arrested from Indore, along with 10 alleged members of the group by Madhya Pradesh State Police's Special Task Force
5 August: Delhi High Court Tribunal lifts ban on SIMI. The lifting of the ban was subsequently stayed by the Supreme Court of India on 6 August 2008.

2012
Union government extended the ban imposed on SIMI by two more years.

2014
The Union government has renewed the ban on Students Islamic Movement of India (SIMI) under the Unlawful Activities (Prevention) Act for another five years.

On 18 May 2014, at Bhopal district court, alleged members who were being produced before the court shouted pro-Taliban slogans saying "Taliban zindabad" (long live Taliban) and indicated a threat to designated Prime Minister Narendra Modi with "Ab Modi ki baari hai"(It is Modi's turn now) at Bhopal district court.

2015
 7 April: Five suspected SIMI activists were shot dead in Nalagonda, Telangana by the same security team who were escorting them in a police van from Warangal jail to a Hyderabad court 150 km away. The police stated that they were trying to escape by snatching weapons. Later the relatives of the dead and some civil activists raised question on the authenticity of the incident. An inquiry by an executive magistrate and judicial inquiry has been ordered into the encounter incident, following a Supreme Court of India directive in 2014.
 1 May: A trial court in Hubli, Karnataka acquitted 17 men who were arrested by Karnataka Police in 2008 on charges of terrorism and criminal conspiracy and allegedly being associated with the SIMI.

2016
 31 October: Eight SIMI activists were killed in alleged encounter after they escaped from high-security Bhopal jail with the help of spoons, plates & bedsheets. A head constable was killed in the incident. The encounter took place 10 km. away from the prison, on the outskirts of the city

2018
 In 2018, NIA court convicted 18 SIMI activists under Section 120B, Sections 10, 38 besides Section 4 of the Explosive Substances Act. Thirteen accused were also found guilty under Section 20 (being members of a terrorist organisation/ gang). They were given up to seven years’ rigorous imprisonment.

See also
 List of organisations banned by the Government of India
 Darsgah-Jihad-O-Shahadat
 Deendar Anjuman

References

Further reading

External links
Taliban’s Mullah Omar our new inspiration, not Osama: jailed SIMI chief
South Asia Terrorism Portal
SIMI arrests reveal Pak nexus
M-Siddiqui
Students Islamic Movement of India: A Profile

Anti-Hindu sentiment
Far-right politics in India
Organizations based in Asia designated as terrorist
Islamic organisations based in India
Islamic terrorism in India
Jihadist groups in India
Student organizations established in 1977
Religiously motivated violence in India
Student organisations in India
1977 establishments in Uttar Pradesh
Organisations designated as terrorist by India
Crime in Ujjain
Indian Mujahideen
Islamist front organizations